Swan Island, part of the Waterhouse Island Group, is a  granite island situated in Banks Strait, part of Bass Strait, lying close to the north-eastern coast of Tasmania, Australia.

Part of the island is privately owned and it contains an automated lighthouse, several houses and an airstrip.  It has previously been subject to grazing by livestock.  Several shipwrecks have been recorded here of vessels passing through Banks Strait; Brenda (1832), Mystery (1850), Union (1852).

Other islands in the Waterhouse Group include the Ninth, Tenth, Waterhouse, Little Waterhouse, Maclean, Baynes, Cygnet, Foster, Little Swan, Bird Rock, George Rocks, St Helens, and Paddys islands.

History

Seal hunting took place here from at least 1805 when a sealing party of nine men were put ashore from the British whaler Ceres (Captain Thompson).

Fauna
Swan Island forms part of the Cape Portland Important Bird Area.  Recorded breeding seabird and wader species are little penguin, short-tailed shearwater, Pacific gull, silver gull, sooty oystercatcher, pied oystercatcher, hooded plover, Caspian tern and crested tern.  Cape Barren geese also nest on the island.  Reptiles present include the metallic skink, White's skink, Bougainville's skink and tiger snake.  European rabbits and house mice are present.

See also

List of islands of Tasmania

References

Islands of North East Tasmania
Important Bird Areas of Tasmania
Waterhouse Island group
Bass Strait
Seal hunting